Film Manufacturers Inc. (FMI) was founded by filmmaker Katharina Otto-Bernstein to create an international production company that develops, produces and co-produces fiction and non-fiction entertainment.

In 2006, FMI’s Absolute Wilson had its world premiere at the Berlin Film Festival; after a successful international festival run, it went on to win the Art Film of the Year award from Art Basel. In 2007, Absolute Wilson – The Biography was published by Prestel Publishing as a companion book.

Otto-Bernstein directed and produced Beautopia for FMI, which screened in competition at Sundance Film Festival in 1998 and won the Silver Hugo at the Chicago Film Festival the same year. FMI's other titles include The Need For Speed, Coming Home, When Night Falls Over Moscow, and The Second Greatest Story Ever Told.

Mapplethorpe: Look at the Pictures, produced by Otto-Bernstein for FMI, received its premiere at Sundance Film Festival in January 2016, followed by the International Premiere at the Berlin Film Festival in February, and a world television premiere on HBO in April. The film was released theatrically in the US and UK in April 2016, followed by the rest of the world. Mapplethorpe: Look at the Pictures was nominated for two Emmy Awards: Outstanding Documentary Or Nonfiction Special and Outstanding Cinematography For A Nonfiction Program.

In 2018, FMI executive-produced The Price of Everything, a documentary examining the role of art and artistic passion in today’s money driven, consumer-based society. The film had its world premiere at Sundance Film Festival, followed by a theatrical run, and a TV premiere on HBO.

In 2019, FMI was a co-producer on the Amazon Prime TV-Series Fur Umme, which is currently developing its second season. 

In 2021, FMI produced the narrative feature Maalsund (starring Ulrich Tukur and Sibel Kekilli, Westdeutscher Rundfunk). Currently in pre-production are Heisenberg (directed by Uli Edel) and The Galapagos Affair (directed by Marc Rothemund).

References

Film production companies of Germany